Retropluma craverii is an extinct species of heterotrematan crabs belonging to the family Retroplumidae. The species name craverii honors the Italian explorer and naturalist Federico Craveri.

Fossil record
Fossils of Retropluma craverii are found in marine strata of the Pliocene of Italy (age range: from 5.333 million to 2.582 million years.

Description
These crabs have subrectangular carapace, longitudinally quite convex, wider than long, with three transverse ridges. Rostrum is elongate, narrow and cylindrical.

References

Crabs